Magallanes Province is one of four provinces in the southern Chilean region of Magallanes and Antártica Chilena. The provincial capital is the city of Punta Arenas.

Geography and demography
Its eastern portion is located along the northern shore of the Strait of Magellan while the western portion straddles the strait on either side of the strait's northwesterly stretch toward the Pacific Ocean. It is bordered by the Última Esperanza Province to the north and Tierra del Fuego to the south.

This is the main terrestrial and aerial entry point to the southernmost region in Chile. Either coming from Argentina, via Río Gallegos by car, or by plane, arriving at the Carlos Ibáñez Del Campo International Airport. On this province there are several touristic places, such as Port Famine, Fuerte Bulnes, two penguin colonies and the first marine park in the country.

It is the ninth largest province in the country. Of these, 116,005 (95.3%) lived in urban areas and 5,670 (4.7%) in rural areas. Between the 1992 and 2002 censuses, the population grew by 4.4% (5,164 persons).

Administration
As a province, Magallanes is a second-level administrative division of Chile, headed by a governor who is appointed by the president. It consists of four communes (Spanish: comunas): Punta Arenas, Río Verde, Laguna Blanca and San Gregorio.

References

External links
 Carlos III Island Marine Park

Provinces of Chile
Provinces of Magallanes Region